Master & Servant is a compilation album by dance band Massive Ego. It consists of eleven of twelve tracks from the album Nite Klub Skewl plus three more new tracks, including the single Sex Drive.
A music video was made for the Lia Organa & Electric Prince remix of Master And Servant and was planned for a release as a single, but the single remained unreleased until 2010 as a double A side with Sex Drive.

Background
Massive Ego licensed theNite Klub Skewl album to the German label, Dance Street/ZYX Records, who re-packaged and renamed the albumMaster & Servant. The only track from Nite Klub Skewl not to be included on this release was, Never Felt As Good.

The band recorded two new songs for the album with Groovesisters; A cover of David Bowie's Hallo Spaceboy and Sex Drive, which was the second single released by Massive Ego, that was a cover of Pete Burns band, Dead Or Alive. and was re-released as a double A-side single with a cover of Depeche Mode's Master And Servant in 2010.

Lia Organa & Electric Prince remixed Master And Servant for the single and video, and later remixed I Like Boys, which was released via the Massive Ego Bandcamp page on 9 July 2013.

Track listing

Personnel

 Vocals: Marc Massive
 Guitar: Steady Eddie Orange Dasher (Track 5)
 Sequencing: Duncan Millar (Track 3)
 Featured vocals: Caron Geary The Infidel (Track 10)
 Featured vocals: Dusty 'O' (Tracks 7 & 8)
 Featured vocals: Maggie K DeMonde (Track 15)
 Featured vocals: Zoe Fuller (Track 6, 12)
 Backing vocals: Jacquii Cann (Track 10)
 Backing vocals: Sally Jaxx (Track 2)
 Backing vocals: Teresa Marie (Track 1)
 Written by: Jewels & Stone (Track 5)
 Written by: Marc Massive (Tracks 8, 13, 14 & 15)
 Written by: Andy J Thirwall (Track 15)
 Written by: Dusty 'O' (Track 8)
 Written by: Barry Stone (Track 5, 14)
 Written by: James Sammon (Pianoman) (Track 13)
 Remix: Ross Alexander (Track 7)
 Remix: Nick Crittenden & Scott Houzet (Groovesisters) (Track 7)
 Remix: Benni Digital (Track 13)
 Producer: Marc Massive (Tracks 8, 14 & 15)
 Producer: Ross Alexander (Track 1, 2, 6, 10 & 12)
 Producer: Sandy Burnett (Track 5)
 Producer: Nick Crittenden & Paul Tams (Track 7)
 Producer: Barry Stone (Track 11 & 13)

References

External links
Official website

2009 albums
Massive Ego albums